Süderbrarup is an Amt ("collective municipality") in the district of Schleswig-Flensburg, in Schleswig-Holstein, Germany. The seat of the Amt is in Süderbrarup.

The Amt Süderbrarup consists of the following municipalities:

References

Ämter in Schleswig-Holstein